In functional analysis, a branch of mathematics, a finite-rank operator is a bounded linear operator between Banach spaces whose range is finite-dimensional.

Finite-rank operators on a Hilbert space

A canonical form 

Finite-rank operators are matrices (of finite size) transplanted to the infinite dimensional setting. As such, these operators may be described via linear algebra techniques.

From linear algebra, we know that a rectangular matrix, with complex entries, M ∈ Cn × m has rank 1 if and only if  M is of the form

Exactly the same argument shows that an operator T on a Hilbert space H is of rank 1 if and only if

where the conditions on α, u, and v are the same as in the finite dimensional case.

Therefore, by induction, an operator T of finite rank n takes the form

where {ui} and {vi} are orthonormal bases. Notice this is essentially a restatement of singular value decomposition. This can be said to be a canonical form of finite-rank operators.

Generalizing slightly, if n is now countably infinite and the sequence of positive numbers {αi} accumulate only at 0, T is then a compact operator, and one has the canonical form for compact operators.

If the series Σi αi is convergent, T is a trace class operator.

Algebraic property
The family of finite-rank operators F(H) on a Hilbert space H form a two-sided *-ideal in L(H), the algebra of bounded operators on H. In fact it is the minimal element among such ideals, that is, any two-sided *-ideal I in L(H) must contain the finite-rank operators. This is not hard to prove. Take a non-zero operator T ∈ I, then Tf = g for some f, g ≠ 0. It suffices to have that for any h, k ∈ H, the rank-1 operator Sh, k that maps h to k lies in I. Define Sh, f to be the rank-1 operator that maps h to f, and Sg, k analogously. Then

which means Sh, k is in I and this verifies the claim.

Some examples of two-sided *-ideals in L(H) are the trace-class, Hilbert–Schmidt operators, and compact operators. F(H) is dense in all three of these ideals, in their respective norms. 

Since any two-sided ideal in L(H) must contain F(H), the algebra L(H) is simple if and only if it is finite dimensional.

Finite-rank operators on a Banach space
A finite-rank operator  between Banach spaces is a bounded operator such that its range is finite dimensional. Just as in the Hilbert space case, it can be written in the form

A bounded linear functional is a particular case of a finite-rank operator, namely of rank one.

References

Operator theory